Rolabogan was an Argentine pop group. It consisted of Piru Sáez, Belén Scalella, María Fernanda Neil, Francisco Bass and Jorge Maggio, lead actors in telenovela El Refugio (de los Sueños). Although they have never officially split up, Rolabogan has recorded only one album.

Discography

See also 
 El Refugio (de los Sueños)

External links 
Rolabogan at MSN

Argentine pop music groups
Musical groups from Buenos Aires